Interacting galaxies (colliding galaxies) are galaxies whose gravitational fields result in a disturbance of one another. An example of a minor interaction is a satellite galaxy disturbing the primary galaxy's spiral arms. An example of a major interaction is a galactic collision, which may lead to a galaxy merger.

Satellite interaction
A giant galaxy interacting with its satellites is common. A satellite's gravity could attract one of the primary's spiral arms.  Alternatively, the secondary satellite can dive into the primary galaxy, as in the Sagittarius Dwarf Elliptical Galaxy diving into the Milky Way.  That can possibly trigger a small amount of star formation.  Such orphaned clusters of stars were sometimes referred to as "blue blobs" before they were recognized as stars.

Galaxy collision

Colliding galaxies are common during galaxy evolution. The extremely tenuous distribution of matter in galaxies means these are not collisions in the traditional sense of the word, but rather gravitational interactions.

Colliding may lead to merging if two galaxies collide and do not have enough momentum to continue traveling after the collision. As with other galaxy collisions, the merging of two galaxies may create a starburst region of new stars. In that case, they fall back into each other and eventually merge into one galaxy after many passes through each other. If one of the colliding galaxies is much larger than the other, it will remain largely intact after the merger. The larger galaxy will look much the same, while the smaller galaxy will be stripped apart and become part of the larger galaxy. When galaxies pass through each other, unlike during mergers, they largely retain their material and shape after the pass.

Galactic collisions are now frequently simulated on computers, which use realistic physics principles, including the simulation of gravitational forces, gas dissipation phenomena, star formation, and feedback. Dynamical friction slows the relative motion galaxy pairs, which may possibly merge at some point, according to the initial relative energy of the orbits. 
A library of simulated galaxy collisions can be found at the Paris Observatory website: GALMER

Gallery

Galactic cannibalism

Galactic cannibalism is a common phenomenon that occurs in the universe, which refers to the process in which a large galaxy, through tidal gravitational interactions with a companion, merges with that companion; that results in a larger, often irregular galaxy.

The most common result of the gravitational merger between two or more galaxies is an irregular galaxy, but elliptical galaxies may also result.

It has been suggested that galactic cannibalism is currently occurring between the Milky Way and the Large and Small Magellanic Clouds. Streams of gravitationally-attracted hydrogen arcing from these dwarf galaxies to the Milky Way is taken as evidence for the theory.

Galaxy harassment 
Galaxy harassment is a type of interaction between a low-luminosity galaxy and a brighter one that takes place within rich galaxy clusters, such as Virgo and Coma, where galaxies are moving at high relative speeds and suffering frequent encounters with other systems of the cluster by the high galactic density of the latter. 
According to computer simulations, the interactions convert the affected galaxy disks into disturbed barred spiral galaxies and produces starbursts followed by, if more encounters occur, loss of angular momentum and heating of their gas.

The result would be the conversion of (late type) low-luminosity spiral galaxies into dwarf spheroidals and dwarf ellipticals.

Evidence for the hypothesis had been claimed by studying early-type dwarf galaxies in the Virgo Cluster and finding structures, such as disks and spiral arms, which suggest they are former disk systems transformed by the above-mentioned interactions.  However, the existence of similar structures in isolated early-type dwarf galaxies, such as LEDA 2108986, has undermined this hypothesis

Notable interacting galaxies

Future collision of the Milky Way with Andromeda

Astronomers have estimated the Milky Way Galaxy will collide with the Andromeda Galaxy in about 4.5 billion years. It is thought that the two spiral galaxies will eventually merge to become an elliptical galaxy or perhaps a large disk galaxy.

See also
 NGC 7318

References

External links

Galaxy Collisions
Galactic cannibalism
Galactic Collision Simulation
GALMER: Galaxy Merger Simulations

 
Extragalactic astronomy
Articles containing video clips